Peltier is a French surname. Notable people with the surname include:

Autumn Peltier (born 2004), climate activist
Harvey Peltier, Jr. (1923-1980), American politician
Harvey Peltier, Sr. (1899-1977), American politician
Jean Charles Athanase Peltier (1785–1845), French physicist, documented the Peltier effect
Lee Peltier (born 1986), English football player
Leonard Peltier (born 1944), Native American activist who was convicted of the murder of two FBI Agents
Leslie Peltier (1900–1980), American astronomer
Thérèse Peltier (1873–1926), French sculptor and aviator
William Richard Peltier (born 1943), University of Toronto professor and physicist

See also 
 Pelletier
 Peltier effect, in physics
 Peltier device, in thermoelectric cooling

French-language surnames